Toirdelbach Ó Conchobair, anglicised Turlough O'Conor, was one of a number of claimants to the kingship of Connacht in the disastrous aftermath of the Second Battle of Athenry. He overthrew Rory na BhFeadh but was himself overthrown in 1318.

Regaining the kingship in 1324, he was the first ruler in over a generation to rule for a lengthy period (till his death in 1342) but the dynasty's activities would now remain within Connacht, as the last attempt to regain the high-kingship ended in 1316. Although overall ruler, successive kings came from different dynastic septs who eventually splintered altogether, with no one Ó Conchobair reigning supreme.

See also
O'Conor

References

 Byrne, Francis John (2001), Irish Kings and High-Kings, Dublin: Four Courts Press, 
 Gaelic and Gaelised Ireland, Kenneth Nicols, 1972.
 The Second Battle of Athenry, Adrian James Martyn, East Galway News & Views, 2008–2009

Further reading

 . Also online: HathiTrust Digital Library, 2019. MiAaHDL, : Electronic reproduction.

External links
Ó Conchobair and Burke at The Irish Story

Kings of Connacht
14th-century Irish monarchs
People from County Roscommon
Toirdelbach